River Yei is a river in South Sudan with its source in Panyana Village, Lujule West payam in the Morobo County of Central Equatoria State.

Nomenclature 
The name Yei was derived from the word yii in Kaliko language, meaning "water."

Features

Central Equatoria 
In Central Equatoria, the river flows through Lujule, Morobo County and Yei River County. The river flows through Yei town where the Kembe River joins along Yei Juba Road.

Aga fall is on River Yei located in wudabi Payam of Morobo County in Central Equatoria State

Western Equatoria 
In Western Equatoria, the river flows through Mundiri west, Lake State, and Unity State.

History 
In 2011 the government of Central Equatoria State under the leadership of Governor Clement Wani Konga planed to launch a power plant in Morobo County.

See also

References 

Rivers of South Sudan